The 17th Grey Cup was played on November 30, 1929, before 1,906 fans at the A.A.A. Grounds at Hamilton.

The Hamilton Tigers defeated the Regina Roughriders 14–3.

External links
 
 

Grey Cup
Grey Cups hosted in Hamilton, Ontario
Grey Cup
1929 in Ontario
November 1929 sports events
20th century in Hamilton, Ontario
Saskatchewan Roughriders